Raja Muhammad Asad Khan (born 29 May 1975) is a Pakistani politician who had been a member of the National Assembly of Pakistan from 2002 to 2013.

He is brother of Raja Muhammad Safdar Khan.

Early life
He was born on 29 May 19xx?????.

Political career
He was elected to the National Assembly of Pakistan from Constituency NA-63 (Jhelum-II) as a candidate of Pakistan Muslim League (N) (PML-N) in 2002 Pakistani general election. He received 46,722 votes and defeated Nawabzada Syed Shams Haider.

He was elected to the National Assembly from Constituency NA-63 (Jhelum-II) as a candidate of PML-N in 2008 Pakistani general election. He received 79,662 votes and defeated Chaudhry Shahbaz Hussain, a candidate of Pakistan Muslim League (Q) (PML-Q).

In 2013, he quit PML-N and joined Pakistan Peoples Party (PPP).

References

Pakistani MNAs 2002–2007
Living people
Pakistani MNAs 2008–2013
People from Jhelum District
1975 births
Army Burn Hall College alumni

Politicians from Jhelum